Bernd Michael Lade (born 24 December 1964) is a German actor and director.  A native of Berlin, he is perhaps best known to audiences outside Germany for his role opposite Peter Sodann in several series of the crime drama Tatort.  Lade's wife is the actress Maria Simon, with whom he has three children.

References

External links 

1964 births
Living people
Film directors from Berlin
German male television actors
Ernst Busch Academy of Dramatic Arts alumni
German male stage actors
German male film actors
East German actors
20th-century German male actors
21st-century German male actors